In the field of enzymology, murburn is a term coined by Kelath Murali Manoj that explains the catalytic mechanism of certain redox-active proteins. The term describes the equilibrium among molecules, unbound ions and radicals, signifying a process of "mild unrestricted redox catalysis".

Murburn is abstracted from "mured burning" (connoting a "closed burning", an oxidative process), and implies equilibriums involving diffusible reactive oxygen species (DRS/DROS/ROS). Though  akin to the oxygen assisted combustion of fuel, unlike the flames produced in the open burning process, the biological reaction occurs in enclosed premises, is mild and may generate heat alone (and no flames). Such a reaction could also incur selective and specific electron/moiety transfers.

Further, though burning is a reaction that usually involves oxygen (aerobic process), "burning flames" produced by anoxic oxidants are also well-known. Therefore, the enzymes working via murburn scheme (aerobic or anaerobic) could be called murzymes and the region around the biomolecule where the DRS interacts with the final ‘substrate’ is called ‘murzone’.

The basic components 

Molecule – Usually a molecule with an extended pi-electronic system or metallic centers with d electrons or a combination of both. A redox protein/enzyme qualifies for this role because it has one or more cofactors with the required attribute. (e.g. hemeproteins, flavoproteins,Cu/Zn proteins, etc.). Occasionally, some proteins that lack the above cofactors but have high amounts of charged residues and suitably located substrate binding sites could also aid DROS dynamics and catalysis (e.g. lactate dehydrogenase, transducin, Complex V, etc.)
Unbound ion – naturally occurring ions of several types, carrying or relaying charges
Radical – transiently generated species in milieu, from any additive or in situ components

Salient features 

While enzyme activities are classically defined by the interaction of the protein with its substrate at a defined active site (necessitating a topological recognition of the interactive participants), murburn scheme obligatorily invokes a DRS (or a reactive radical) for carrying out this agenda.
The conventional enzyme-substrate interaction scheme invokes Fischer’s lock and key type affinity or Koshland’s induced fit theory. That is, a substrate is identified by the enzyme by virtue of a topographical complementation, and thereafter, the enzyme-substrate complex undergoes a "transition-state," leading to products.

Such a system shows certainty/determinism, usually abides by the standard models of kinetics (like Michaelis-Menten scheme) and the inhibitors may be of competitive, non-competitive, uncompetitive, etc. The classical enzymes have a unique substrate or a well defined set of substrates.

In contrast, murburn scheme (as shown in figure) might invoke an enzyme-substrate complementation, but this aspect is not obligatory. The kinetics of the reaction may at times not be traceable with standard models because the diffusible reactive species is subjected to multiple equilibriums and the product of interest may be favorably formed only in discrete concentrations of the protagonists.

Therefore, the outcomes in such systems could be subjected to a lot of uncertainty and the overall reaction scheme might exhibit varying and non-integral stoichiometry. The modulators/influencers (activators or inhibitors) may work by mixed modalities, owing to affects on the protein, substrate or the diffusible species. The murzymes may have a wide variety of substrates, as the reaction scheme is dependent on multiple modalities of interactions and outcomes. These considerations seek us to overcome the aesthetic perspective that DROS are mere manifestations of pathophysiology. A relevant comparison is that the presence of knife-racks, cutting boards and gloves in kitchen (analogous to enzymes like superoxide dismutase and catalase, membrane-embedded proteins with one-electron active redox centers, etc.) does not mean that knife is a dangerous component that must be avoided. On the contrary, it is an important tool across the globe that has to be used with adequate care. Quite similarly, the cellular machinery has evolved to harness the reaction potential of DRS. The aesthetic perspective/concern that DRS would wreak havoc in routine physiology is no more relevant because several decades of research has now clearly established that DRS are routinely observed and unavoidable in physiology, and they cannot be just wished away. It has also been demonstrated that sustained release of DRS could afford selectivity (choice of a particular reactant from a variety, say B from A, B, C and D) and specificity (attack at a specific locus, like alpha- or para- positions of a reactant). Therefore, such a selectivity can be compared to how setting fire to a damp cloth dipped in oil burns the oil first and minimally chars the cloth's fabric. Analogously, murburn activity has cumulative collateral damage, which leads to aging, and ultimately, death. Murburn concept stresses the already well-established fundamental awareness that all molecules/processes in life have spatial, temporal, quantitative and contextual relevance. A comparison of the classical perspectives and murburn concept is given in the figure and the perceptional changes ushered in by murburn concept can be captured in the Table 1.

The new mechanism has been proposed as an explanation for phenomena involving catalytic electron or moiety transfers, chemico-physical changes and unusual observations in various experimental, ecological, metabolic and physiological scenarios. Fundamentally, murburn concept advocates the thesis that DRS are vital requirements for routine metabolic and physiological functions. This theory is validated by its ability to explain the toxicity of cyanide to a variety of important life processes (particularly, respiration and photosynthesis).

Application 
Heme/flavin enzymology and electron transfer phenomena Enzymes containing heme and flavin groups (as exemplified by peroxidases, catalases, reductases, etc.) are ubiquitous in cellular systems. While several moiety and electron transfer reactions they catalyze are mediated at the active site (heme/flavin center), some reactions are mediated via diffusible species. Going beyond the Michaelis-Menten paradigm to explain the outcomes of the latter types of reactions (with various additives and inhibitors) is the core purview of murburn concept.
 
Ecology Fungal heme haloperoxidases (like chloroperoxidase) are the ultimate source for the generation of the vast majority of all natural halogenated organics in the environment and hemeperoxidases are also responsible for the breakdown of plant lignocellulosic materials. Thus, the murburn activities of hemeperoxidases are very important for explaining the carbon/halogen cycles.
Drug/Xenobiotic metabolism The man-made drugs and xenobiotics present a molecular topology that the cellular system may not be aware of, and therefore, a definite affinity-based identification of the alien molecule may not be feasible. The classical P450cam based model fails to explain the promiscuity of reduction of dozens of liver microsomal cytochrome P450s by a unique reductase (which is distributed at much lower concentrations) and it is also inexplicable therein how diverse drug molecules are reacted by a single CYP or why some CYPs do not convert a given drug. Also, drug-drug interactions based on active site binding effects alone cannot explain the outcomes. With the obligatory involvement of DRS, the murburn scheme affords a tangible modality to account for the way the hepatocytes deal with such challenges and the new model could potentially explain diverse types of drug interactions and outcomes of mutations.
Cellular respiration thermogenesis and dynamic homeostasis In the initial phase of evolution, an affinity-based identification may not have been present. Also, mitochondria possess finger-countable protons whereas tens of thousands of purported proton-pumping protein complexes. Further, oxygen is a highly mobile molecule that cannot be expected to remain non-reactive in the presence of the multitude of redox centers present in the mitochondrial membrane respiratory complexes. With respect to these considerations, the classical electron transport chain (ETC) based chemiosmotic rotary ATP synthesis (CRAS) model becomes untenable. The murburn model presents a new interpretation of the physiology of cellular respiration: including oxidative phosphorylation, thermogenesis and dynamic redox homeostasis. Also, the effects of a wide bevy of respiratory toxins (as exemplified by cyanide) to diverse physiologies and life forms are explained by the murburn scheme, which invokes DRS.
Hemoglobin in erythrocyte physiology RBCs function viably for about 4 months, although lacking a nucleus (for genetic regulations) or mitochondria (for carrying out the classical oxidative phosphorlation). A quantitative assessment shows that the glycolytic machinery present within is inadequate for the bioenergetic requirements of erythrocytes. Murburn concept based explorations revealed that the highly packed tetrameric hemoglobin could synthesize ATP using a DRS-based logic. The new perspective affords better structure-function correlations for the various monomers (A,B & F) of the protein and roles of nicotinamide nucleotides and bisphosphoglycerate.
Hormesis and idiosyncratic dose responses It has been a long-standing conundrum as to how certain molecules may produce a physiological effect at a low concentration whereas little impact is seen at higher concentrations. Classical ligand-receptor and enzyme-substrate binding interactive scheme can afford only mono-phasic (hyperbolic) or bell-shaped (when a molecule becomes toxic above a critical level) dose responses. Murburn concept affords a molecular explanation for such hormetic and certain types of idiosyncratic (person to person or case dependent “reactions”) physiological dispositions.
Oxygenic photosynthesis The tapping of sunlight's energy forms the primary means of provision of carbon-centered organic molecules for sustaining life on our planet. The classical explanations of Kok-Joliot cycle, Z-scheme, Q-cycle, etc. were demonstrated to be untenable. A murburn model (involving DROS) of sunlight harvesting (involving DROS) was recently proposed as a mechanism for the explanation of Emerson effect and several other observations (like the enhancement effect of bicarbonate ions on oxygen evolution, the enhancement of chloride ions on e-transfers in vitro, etc.) that were incompatible with the classical purview.
Ionic differentials and electrophysiology  Classical membrane theory espouses that ionic differentials in and out of cells arise due to pumping by membrane-embedded proteins like Na-K-ATPase. Also in this purview, the source of trans-membrane potential (TMP) results due to difference of concentration of ions across phases. In the context or TMP fluctuations, murburn model brings in a new perspective of effective charge separation leading to an excess of negative charges transiently resulting inside, due to the ability of oxygen to accept free electron(s).Further, preferential co-solubilization of cations by respiratory activity has been pointed out as another reason for ion-differentials.
Physiology of vision The traditional visual cycle does not have any direct role for oxygen and entails the rods and cones serving as the primary photo-transduction agents. It involves retinal cis-trans conformation change and ejection from rhodopsin, conformation change of transducin and cycling via the retinal pigmented epithelium. In the new charted murburn cascade, photoexcitation of rhodopsin leads to the formation of superoxide, which attacks the GDP bound on alpha transducin, forming GTP, which detaches and gets converted to GDP by the beta module of transducin. The liberated GDP is an allosteric activator of phosphodiesterase-6, which enables the activation of c-GMP cascade. Therefore, in the murburn purview, oxygen is directly involved in visual physiology and rod/cone cells are the ultimate source of electrons. The murburn model also provides a better platform to explain the resolution, depth perception, architecture of eye and its evolution.
Lactate dehydrogenase (LDH) Classical perception deems that isozyme LDH-A converts pyruvate to lactate whereas LDH-B converts lactate to pyruvate, the reaction being freely reversible via the same mechanistic route. Murburn concept corrected this erroneous perception and provided thermodynamic and structural insights to demarcate new a new pathway and mechanism for LDH functioning in liver, using DRS. Muscles have 4 folds the concentration of the same isozyme of LDH-A, which is also found in liver. Therefore, the classical explanation fails to reason why lactate must be transported to liver or mitochondria for effective recycling. Murburn concept reasons out such conundrums and also affords a new approach for understanding Warburg effect and therapy of cancer.
Origin and evolution of life Earlier perceptions considered proton/ionic gradients as the primary bioenergetic principle. In this purview, it was difficult to conceive how a purported molecular nanomotor like Complex V could evolve for ATP synthesis, at the primordial states of life's origin. Murburn concept offers effective charge separation as a simpler principle for the cell's viability as a simple chemical engine that could do useful work. The murburn view projects TMP as a side-product of cellular metabolic activity, and not as the primary driving force of cellular bioenergetics.

Criticism 

The murburn concept has been used to criticize classical perceptions like Peter Mitchell’s and Paul Boyer’s chemiosmotic rotary ATP synthesis mechanism. These criticisms have been called into question. These criticisms have in turn been responded to.

Prospects 
The late Lowell Hager (Member, NAS-USA and Professor of Biochemistry at UIUC) recognized the DRS-mediated murburn selectivity/specificity mechanism in chloroperoxidase. Two books authored by respected European researchers were published in the UK that favorably discussed murburn concept. Articles based in murburn concept were given cover-page credits in four annual volumes (2017, 2018, 2019 and 2020) of Biomedical Reviews (the official journal of Bulgarian Society for Cell Biology) and the 167th (December 2021) volume of Progress in Biophysics and Molecular Biology (Elsevier). The advocates of murburn concept have provided precepts and proof of concept for murburn models of diverse life processes (drug metabolism, cellular respiration, thermogenesis, homeostasis, photosynthesis, electrophysiology, photo-transduction in retina, lactate metabolism in liver, role of hemoglobin in erythrocytes, etc.). Their comparative analyses also address the essential theoretical criteria (thermodynamics, kinetics, mechanism, structure-function correlations, evolutionary considerations, Ockham's razor/probability, etc.) and reported experimental findings. These writings also present pan-systemic and holistic appeal of the new theory and call out the untenable nature of several classical perceptions. Thus, murburn concept is poised to expand the classical concepts of biocatalysis, biological electron transfers, metabolism and physiology, leading to the discontinuation of several unrealistic terms/ideas in classical redox enzymology (like - electron transport chain, Z-scheme, Q-cycle, Kok-Joliot cycle, chemiosmosis, proton motive force, rotary ATP synthesis, etc.) that are currently advocated in textbooks. The erstwhile terms were invented to explain redox protein activity when murburn concept was not unraveled and researchers had confined their explorations to active-site and affinity-based logic alone. Incorporating murburn concept in teaching and research is the next step in the sequence of scientific progression.

References 

Enzymes
Catalysis